The Bodil Awards are the major Danish film awards given by the Danish Film Critics Association. The awards are presented annually at a ceremony in Copenhagen. Established in 1948, it is one of the oldest film awards in Europe. The awards are given without regard to commercial interests or box-office sales, but rather to highlight the films or actors that the critics regard as most worthy.

The name of the award honours two of the most important actresses in Danish cinema, Bodil Kjer and Bodil Ipsen. The statuette is made of porcelain, and was designed by Danish artist  and sculpted by Svend Jespersen of Bing & Grøndahl.

Categories 
Awards are presented for the following categories:

Merit awards
 Best Danish Film
 Best Actor
 Best Actress
 Best Supporting Actor
 Best Supporting Actress
 Best American Film, awarded as Best Non-European Film from 1961 until 1969
 Best Non-American Film, awarded as Best European Film from 1961 until 1969
 Best Documentary
 Best Cinematographer
 Best Screenplay, annually since 2015

Special awards
 Honorary Award, since 1951 and pro re nata until 1997; since then annually
 Special Award, annually since 2008

External awards
 Henning Bahs Award, annually since 2012 for excellence in production design
 Arbejdernes Landsbank Talentprisen, annually since 2020 for a young talent

See also 
 Robert Awards

References

External links 
  
 Bodil Awards in the Internet Movie Database

 
Danish film awards